Mahavitaran or Mahadiscom or MSEDCL (Maharashtra State Electricity Distribution Company Limited) is a wholly-owned  subsidiary of the Maharashtra State Electricity Board. It is the largest electricity distribution utility in India  (2nd largest in the World after SGCC in terms of consumers]. MSEDCL distributes electricity to the entire state of Maharashtra except for some parts of Mumbai city where Brihanmumbai Electric Supply and Transport, Tata Power and Adani Electricity Mumbai Limited are electricity distributors.

History
The erstwhile Maharashtra State Electricity Board (MSEB) was looking after Generation, Transmission & Distribution of Electricity in the State of Maharashtra. But with the enactment of the Electricity Act 2003 of the Government of India, MSEB was unbundled into 4 Companies on 6 June 2005 viz.

 MSEB Holding Company Limited
 Mahanirmiti (महानिर्मिती) or Mahagenco (Maharashtra State Power Generation Company Limited (MSPGCL))
 Mahapareshan (महापारेषण) or Mahatransco (Maharashtra State Electricity Transmission Company Limited (MSETCL))
 Mahavitaran (महावितरण) or Mahadiscom (Maharashtra State Electricity Distribution Company Limited (MSEDCL))

Of these, Mahavitaran is responsible for the distribution of electricity throughout the state by buying power from either MahaGenco, Captive Power Plants, or from other State Electricity Boards and Private sector power generation companies. The 'MSEB Holding Company' was created to hold all the stakes in these three companies.

Customers
MSEDCL supplies electricity to a total of 28.4 million consumers across the categories all over Maharashtra. There are about 20.7 million Domestic Residential (72.4%), 4 million Agricultural (16%), 1.7 million commercial (7%), and 0.346million  industrial consumers (1.8 0%) in MSEDCL who fetch an Annual Revenue of about Rs.500 million. The consumption share of Residential Consumers is 19.03%, Commercial Consumers is 7.35%, Industrial Consumers is 42%, Agricultural Consumers is 25.13% and others is 6.49%.

Organisation structure
MSEDCL operates through a network of offices consisting of a Corporate Office in Mumbai, 4 Regional Offices (Konkan, Pune, Aurangabad & Nagpur), 16 Zonal Offices, 44 Circle Offices, and 145 Divisional Offices.

Sources of power
MSEDCL's sources of power include thermal, hydro, gas, and non-conventional sources like solar, wind, bagasse, etc. apart from hydropower of the Koyna Hydroelectric Project. Thermal power constitutes the major share which it gets from Mahagenco projects, Central Sector projects, and RGPPL.

Infrastructure
In terms of infrastructure, MSEDCL operates a vast far-flung network comprising 
 33 kV, 22 kV & 11 kV transmission lines,
 Sub-stations and Distribution Transformers spread over 3.08 lakh km2 geographical area of Maharashtra covering 41,928 villages and 457 towns. 
 It has 2680 sub-stations & Switching Stations with 49,000 MVA of transformation capacity, 10,334 HV feeders, and several thousand circuit km of HT and LT lines.

Human resource development
MSEDCL has a workforce of about 54,546 employees.

Important projects 
To overcome the power crisis and improve consumer services MSEDCL made an in-depth study involving sub-division-wise research of distribution networks and planned ambitious projects. They include :

Infra-plan
MSEDCL's existing network handles a load of about 10,000 to 11,000 MW. By 2012, there will be an addition of another 10,000 MW in the system. With a view to cater to future load, provide quality, reliable energy supply, and reduce losses MSEDCL formulated Rs. 11000 crore infrastructure plan. The plan envisages the erection and commissioning of 586 sub-stations, 52351 circuit kilometers of HT lines, 58,629 distribution transformers besides augmentation of the existing network. MSEB had erected 1846 sub-stations during its lifetime, whereas MSEDCL aims to construct 586 sub-stations in just 2 years. A leap forward in the direction of infrastructure development. The project is being implemented on a total turn-key basis and through 119 DPRs. Orders of about Rs. 9189 crore has already been placed on various agencies. Earlier capital investment for infrastructure development was a paltry sum of Rs. 200 to 300 crore per year. The new infrastructure with augmentation and renovation of the distribution network will revolutionize the quality and reliability of supply.

Load management
MSEDCL has been implementing long-term Load Management schemes to reduce load shedding. Feeder separation is one such long-term scheme in which agriculture feeders are carved out. This not only helps load management but also strengthens the infrastructure and reduces technical losses. MSEDCL has also implemented Single Phasing Scheme in some parts of Maharashtra. Currently rural areas face 8.30 to 11 hours of load shedding a day which is decided by MERC. However, the load shedding hours have been almost halved in about 24,461 villages that have been covered so far under these schemes. The load shedding duration of these villages has come down to 2.00 to 5.45 hours which is on par with urban areas. The project cost of these schemes is Rs. 3233 crores.

Rajiv Gandhi Gramin Vidhutikarn Yojana (RGGVY)
This is a flagship scheme of Govt. of India. There are 4,709 villages and 13,44,087 identified BPL households targeted to be electrified under this scheme. MSEDCL had prepared proposals for 34 schemes costing Rs. 829 crore for 33 districts of Maharashtra. Maharashtra has been implementing the scheme and has spent Rs. 443 crore so for. Connections to 905541 BPL households have been released and 4243 villages electrified under the scheme. BPL families are provided with 1.5 point power connections at a nominal charge of Rs.15/- each and the villages are electrified as per the new definition under this scheme.

Restructured – Accelerated Power Development & Reforms Programme (R-APDRP)
R-APDRP is a flagship scheme sponsored by Govt. of India and financed by the Power Finance Corporation of India (PFC). There are 134 towns having population of more than 30,000 as per the 2001 census selected in Maharashtra under this scheme. The scheme is being implemented in two phases – Part-A and Part-B. Creation of IT infrastructure and allied works are included in Part-A for which a turnkey contract for 95 towns has been awarded to M/s.Larsen & Toubro Ltd. while M/s Spanco Ltd has been awarded the Part 'A' contract for the remaining 35 towns. On completion of Part-A, the works under Part-B which include renovation and modernization of distribution network, load bifurcation, load balancing, aerial bunched conductoring, HVDS, capacitor bank, etc. will be taken up. Distribution loss in R-APDRP towns is targeted to be reduced to 15%.

Major achievements post restructuring
Energisation of Agricultural Pumps: Maharashtra has a record number, highest as compared to any state, of agricultural pumps energized so far. The number is about 30 lakhs. Earlier, there used to be a long list of pending applications and the farmers used to wait for years together for supply. The issue was addressed in a proper perspective by MSEDCL. Nowadays about 1 lakh agricultural pumps are energized every year. MSEDCL, in a year or two, would be in a position to grant agricultural connections on-demand on par with other categories of consumers.

Loss reduction
In 5 years, MSEDCL reduced distribution losses from 35% to 20% through various drives such as:

Anti theft drive
This is being implemented on regular basis. MSEDCL has established 50 flying squads functioning under Security and Enforcement department to detect and handle power theft cases quickly.

Meter shifting
For many consumers, meters were installed in hard-to-access places, making theft easy to conceal. MSEDCL, therefore, decided to shift all meters to the front of buildings to make them as conspicuous as possible. This project is currently in progress on a large scale.

Mass meter replacement project
MSEDCL has decided to replace all the meters which have been in service for the last 10 years and more under the mass meter replacement program. It is planned to replace all the electromechanical meters with static ones. A process has already been initiated for purchasing about 30 lakh meters for the purpose. This is a huge project which will definitely lead to increase in metered sales.

Energy accounting
MSEDCL has undertaken accurate energy accounting through various methods such as :

Feeder metering
MSEDCL plans to install high-quality meters at all necessary system points, including interconnecting points. Feeder metering of all 10,240 feeders in complete and again, photo reading of these feeder meters are taken.

DTC metering
There are total 2,84,633 Distribution Transformer Centers(DTCs) in operation, out of which about 1.51 Lakh DTCs have already been metered.

Distribution franchisee
Bhiwandi, a power loom city, had typical problems like rampant theft and non-payment. MSEDCL opted for an input-based franchisee model for electricity distribution. It has handed over Bhiwandi Circle to M/S Torrent Power on 26 January 2007. This experiment proved to be very successful and a trendsetter in the power distribution sector of the Country.  Its later Distribution franchisee attempts for Aurangabad Urban I & II Divisions of Aurangabad Urban Circle (M/s GTL Private Limited) and Gandhibag, Civil Lines, and Mahal Divisions of Nagpur Urban Circle (given to M/s Spanco & later M/s Essel group) miserably failed after a few years of operation and MSEDCL has to take over these areas after facing huge loss of revenue from these two Metro Cities. Recently the company has appointed Distribution Franchisees for Malegaon town.

Zero load shedding model
Zero Load Shedding Model is being implemented at certain places with the active participation of local citizens through consumer groups and peoples representatives. The mechanism is extremely transparent and is prior approved by the Regulator. In this model, a costly power to the extent of shortfall is arranged for which a reliability charge is levied upon the local consumers. Beginning in Pune, the model was implemented in Navi Mumbai, Thane, Pen and Baramati. Of late MSEDCL itself filed a petition before the MERC for implementing Zero Load Shedding Model at all the Headquarters of Revenue Divisions - Nagpur, Amravati, Navi Mumbai, Pune and Aurangabad. The MERC approved the proposal and the model was implemented at these headquarters from December 2009. MSEDCL has planned to extend it further to district headquarters, taluka headquarters and so on.

See also
 Maharashtra Electricity Regulatory Commission (MERC)

References

Electric power distribution network operators in India
Energy in Maharashtra
State electricity agencies of India
State agencies of Maharashtra
Companies based in Mumbai
Energy companies established in 2005
Indian companies established in 2005
2005 establishments in Maharashtra